The Mustache Dashe is a 5k running race that started in Seattle, Washington but now operates in a number of United States cities.  It is organized by BTO Multisports and is an all-ages event.  A portion of each entry fee goes to prostate cancer research and other men's health causes, and each participant is engaged to conduct further fundraising.  The Mustache Dashe takes place each November, the same month as Movember.

References

External links 
 mustachedashe at weebly

5K runs
Sports competitions in Seattle
Moustache